Niklas Anton Juhana Pyyhtiä (born 25 September 2003) is a Finnish professional footballer who plays as a midfielder for Serie A side Bologna.

Club career
He made his Serie A debut on 17 January 2022 in a match against Napoli.

Career statistics

Club

References 

2003 births
Living people
Finnish footballers
Finland youth international footballers
Finland under-21 international footballers
Association football midfielders
Turun Palloseura footballers
Bologna F.C. 1909 players
Veikkausliiga players
Serie A players
Finnish expatriate footballers
Expatriate footballers in Italy
Finnish expatriate sportspeople in Italy